Mister Ecuador (Organización Mr. Ecuador) is an annual national male beauty pageant  based in Guayaquil, established in 1990 by businessman Cesar Montece, that selects Ecuador's representatives to international competitions.

History
Mister Ecuador was founded in 1990 by businessman Cesar Montece (+) owner of the Queen of Ecuador company who died in 2010.

Titleholders

Representatives at Mister International
Color key

Representatives at Mister Global 

Color key

Winners and runner-up at International Pageants
Color key

See also
Miss Ecuador
Miss Teen Ecuador

References

External links
Official page

Ecuador
Beauty pageants in Ecuador
Ecuadorian awards
Man of the World (pageant)
Mister Global by country